Françoise Gallimard, born in Paris, is a French business woman.

Biography 
The daughter of Claude Gallimard, who was president of the publishing house Éditions Gallimard (from 1976 to 1988), and Simone Gallimard, who headed the Mercure de France, Françoise Gallimard resold in 1990, along with her brother Christian Gallimard, the shares she held in the publishing group then led by her brother Antoine Gallimard: the case was settled in 1992 with the creation of the Groupe Madrigall.

In 1997, she created, together with the UNESCO, the Prix UNESCO-Françoise Gallimard for the promotion of French-language literature. This prize, awarded every April 23, is endowed with $15,000, Françoise Gallimard funding the organization of this prize to the tune of $50,000 a year.

She is the mother of  writer and journalist Thibault de Montaigu.

References

External links 
 Paul Haskell Marries Francoise Gallimard on the NYT (16 March 1964)
 Enfants Terribles on Vanity Fair (3 December 2013)
 Succession Gallimard on INA.fr (3 April 1990)

Businesspeople from Paris
French women chief executives
20th-century French businesswomen
20th-century French businesspeople
Living people
Year of birth missing (living people)
Francoise